Elliott Brown Bannister III (born August 15, 1951) is an contemporary Christian music (CCM) producer and songwriter. Bannister released one album of his own, Talk to One Another, in 1981 on NewPax Records. It was reissued on the Reunion Records label five years later, featuring a newer recording of the album's final cut, "Create in Me a Clean Heart". The original NewPax version featured Ed DeGarmo on the Hammond B3 organ; the 1986 version featured Amy Grant and her then husband Gary Chapman on vocals. The 1986 version was released as a radio single and gained moderate airplay in some markets.

Bannister is best known for his work in the audio engineering, recording, and production industry. He formed his own independent label, Vireo Records, in 1991. Bannister has won 25 Dove Awards and 14 Grammy awards. He also was inducted into the Gospel Music Hall of Fame. He has written many songs, notably for Amy Grant. Bannister also taught Grant in his Sunday School class at Belmont Church of Christ.

Bannister, born in Topeka, Kansas, is a 1975 graduate of Abilene Christian University. His daughters are Ellie Holcomb and Caroline (Carly) Blair Bannister.

Awards and accolades

Dove Awards
1981: The Imperials, "Praise the Lord" - Song of the Year
1981: Debby Boone, With My Song - Album by a Secular Artist
1983: Amy Grant, Age to Age - Pop/Contemporary Album of the Year
1984: Debby Boone, Surrender - Album by a Secular Artist
1985: Amy Grant, Straight Ahead - Pop/Contemporary Album of the Year
1989: Amy Grant, Lead Me On - Pop/Contemporary Album of the Year
1992: Bruce Carroll, Sometime Miracles Hide - Country Album of the Year
1993: Paul Overstreet, Love is Strong - Country Album of the Year
1994: Michael English, Hope -  Pop/Contemporary Album of the Year
1994: Bruce Carroll, Walk On - Country Album of the Year
1994: Petra, Wake Up Call - Rock Album of the Year
1996: Various Artists, My Utmost for His Highest  – Special Event Album of the Year
1997:  Steven Curtis Chapman, Signs of Life - Pop/Contemporary Album of the Year
1998: Producer of the Year
2000: Producer of the Year
2000: Steven Curtis Chapman, Speechless - Pop/Contemporary Album of the Year
2001: Producer of the Year
2002: Steven Curtis Chapman, Declaration -  Pop/Contemporary Album of the Year
2002: Cece Winans, CeCe Winans  – Contemporary Gospel Album of the Year
2003: Producer of the Year
2003: Amy Grant, Legacy...Hymns and Faith – Inspirational Album of the Year
2004: Producer of the Year
2006: Bart Millard, Hymned – Inspirational Album of the Year
2006: Amy Grant, Rock of Ages...Hymns and Faith -  Inspirational Album of the Year
2007: End of the Spear Soundtrack – Instrumental Album of the Year
2012: The Story - Special Event Album of the Year

Grammy Awards
1980: Debby Boone, With My Song - Best Inspirational Performance
1982: Amy Grant, Age To Age - Best Gospel Performance, Contemporary
1983: Amy Grant, Ageless Medley - Best Gospel Performance, Female
1984: Amy Grant, "Angels" - Best Gospel Performance, Female
1984: Debby Boone & Phil Driscoll, "Keep the Flame Burning" from Surrender - Best Gospel Performance by a Duo or Group
1985: Amy Grant, Unguarded - Best Gospel Performance, Female
1988: Amy Grant, Lead Me On - Best Gospel Performance, Female
1992: Bruce Carroll, Sometimes Miracles Hide - Best Southern Gospel Album
1994: Petra, Wake-Up Call - Best Rock Gospel Album
1999: Steven Curtis Chapman, Speechless - Best Pop/Contemporary Gospel Album
2001: CeCe Winans, CeCe Winans - Best Pop/Contemporary Gospel Album
2004: Steven Curtis Chapman, All Things New - Best Pop/Contemporary Gospel Album
2005: Amy Grant, Rock of Ages, Hymns & Faith - Best Southern, Country or Bluegrass Gospel Album
2006: Third Day, Wherever You Are'' - Best Pop/Contemporary Gospel Album

Gospel Music Hall of Fame
2014

Credits
Bannister has produced or engineered works for the following artists:

The Afters
Carolyn Arends
Susan Ashton
Avalon
Warren Barfield
Debby Boone
Building 429
Jeremy Camp
Carman
Bruce Carroll
Steven Curtis Chapman
Bryan Duncan
Chris Eaton
Michael English
Amy Grant
Sara Groves
Kim Hill
The Imperials
The Katinas
Kutless
Rachael Lampa
Mandisa
David Meece
MercyMe
Bart Millard
Rich Mullins
Bebo Norman
Out of the Grey
Paul Overstreet
Twila Paris
Sandi Patty
Charlie Peacock
Kris Allen
Petra
PFR
Phillips, Craig & Dean
Point of Grace
Kerrie Roberts
Kenny Rogers
Mark Schultz
Chris Sligh
Michael W. Smith
Michael Tait
John Tesh
Third Day
B.J. Thomas
Kathy Troccoli
Ronan Tynan
Jaci Velasquez
Steve Wariner
Wayne Watson
Matthew West
Phil Wickham
CeCe Winans
Joy Williams
White Heart
Darlene Zschech

References

External links
[ Brown Bannister], Allmusic.com

1951 births
Living people
Abilene Christian University alumni
American members of the Churches of Christ
Record producers from Kansas
Place of birth missing (living people)